Vala Fareed (born 1975) is a Minister of State for the Kurdistan Region of Iraq. She was previously elected as the first female speaker of the legislature in February 2019. 

Born in Erbil, Fareed has a degree in law, and was elected to the Kurdistan Region Parliament in September 2018.

On 18 February 2019, Fareed was nominated by the Kurdistan Democratic Party (KDP), and received 68 votes. The session was boycotted by politicians from the Patriotic Union of Kurdistan (PUK), and Fareed was appointed as interim speaker until the PUK and KDP are able to reach agreement on a permanent appointment.

According to VOA, the KDP stated that once they and the PUK had reached an agreement, the role of speaker would revert to being a political appointee of the PUK. "Whenever there is an agreement between the two parties, we will withdraw our candidate and vote for the PUK candidate, per our agreement," said the PDK bloc leader Umed Khoshnaw. A draft agreement reached on February 5 requires a PUK representative to hold the post of parliamentary speaker.

Fareed's appointment means that two of the three top positions in the KRG parliament are occupied by women, with Muna Kahveci, from the Turkmen Reform Party, also being elected as second deputy speaker. The KRG parliament operates a quota system requiring 30% of MPs to be female.

In 2019, Fareed was appointed as Regional Minister of State in the KRG Cabinet.

References

Living people
1975 births
Speakers of the Kurdistan Region Parliament
21st-century Iraqi women politicians
Kurdistan Democratic Party politicians
21st-century Iraqi politicians
Kurdish politicians